Bojan Ostojić (born 12 February 1984) is a Serbian professional footballer who plays as a defender for Teleoptik.

Career

Early years
Ostojić started out at his hometown club Sevojno, making his senior debut in 2002. He was subsequently transferred to Sloboda Užice on a season-long loan, before permanently joining them in 2006. After two more seasons at Begluk, Ostojić moved to Radnički Kragujevac in July 2008. He spent one season at Čika Dača, before returning to Sloboda.

In the summer of 2010, Ostojić joined BASK, immediately helping them win the Serbian First League. However, they withdrew from the Serbian SuperLiga, ceding their spot to Novi Pazar. Likewise, numerous players were transferred in the same way, including Ostojić. He made his debut in the top flight of Serbian football on 13 August 2011, playing the full 90 minutes in a 5–0 away loss against Partizan. In the 2012–13 season, Ostojić was a regular member of Voždovac, appearing in all of his team's 34 league fixtures and scoring three goals in the process.

Čukarički
In the summer of 2013, Ostojić signed with SuperLiga newcomers Čukarički. He spent the following three seasons at the club, making 92 appearances and scoring four goals in all competitions, while helping them win the Serbian Cup in 2015. In the 2015–16 campaign, Ostojić was named in the league's team of the season, alongside his two teammates.

Partizan

2016–17 season
On 1 July 2016, Ostojić signed a one-plus-one-year contract with Partizan. He made his competitive debut for the club on 31 July, playing the full 90 minutes in a 1–2 away league loss to Napredak Kruševac. On 15 October, Ostojić scored his first goal for Partizan in a 3–0 away league win against his former club Voždovac. He subsequently established a formidable central defense partnership with Nikola Milenković, helping Partizan win the double. Due to his consistent performances throughout the season, Ostojić was named in the league's best eleven for the second year in a row.

2017–18 season
In June 2017, Ostojić extended his contract with Partizan for two more years. He opened the season with a header from Petar Đuričković's 89th-minute corner to give his team a 1–0 win over Vojvodina on 13 August. During a league game versus Rad on 7 March 2018, Ostojić suffered a ligament injury that caused him to miss the rest of the season.

2018–19 season
In June 2018, Ostojić was reportedly negotiating with some Cypriot and Turkish clubs, but the transfer never went through. He eventually remained at Partizan, managing to appear in just one Serbian Cup game during the first half of the season. After the appointment of Savo Milošević as manager, Ostojić started receiving more playing time. He scored the only goal in the 2019 Serbian Cup final against fierce rivals Red Star Belgrade to help Partizan win the trophy for the fourth consecutive time.

2019–20 season
In June 2019, Ostojić turned down an offer from Vojvodina and extended his contract with Partizan for another year. He made 37 appearances across all competitions during the 2019–20 season, scoring a goal in a 6–2 home league win over Javor Ivanjica.

Career statistics

Honours

Club
BASK
 Serbian First League: 2010–11
Čukarički
 Serbian Cup: 2014–15
Partizan
 Serbian SuperLiga: 2016–17
 Serbian Cup: 2016–17, 2017–18, 2018–19

Individual
 Serbian SuperLiga Team of the Season: 2015–16, 2016–17

References

External links
 
 
 

Association football defenders
FK BASK players
FK Čukarički players
FK Novi Pazar players
FK Partizan players
FK Radnički 1923 players
FK Sevojno players
FK Sloboda Užice players
FK Teleoptik players
FK Voždovac players
Serbia and Montenegro footballers
Serbian First League players
Serbian footballers
Serbian SuperLiga players
Sportspeople from Užice
1984 births
Living people